A punk is a smoldering stick used for lighting firework fuses. It is safer than a match or a lighter because it can be used from a greater distance and does not use an open flame. They are made of bamboo and a brown coating of compressed sawdust. Punks often resemble sticks of incense, and in some countries actual incense sticks are used in a similar fashion. Punks are sold at nearly all firework stands and many stands will include them for free with a purchase.

See also
Black match
Slow match
Pyrotechnics
Tinder

References 

Fireworks
Firelighting